Francisco Calamita (9 November 1922 – 9 February 2007) was a Spanish swimmer. He competed in the men's 100 metre backstroke at the 1948 Summer Olympics.

References

External links
 

1922 births
2007 deaths
Olympic swimmers of Spain
Swimmers at the 1948 Summer Olympics
Sportspeople from Santa Cruz de Tenerife
Spanish male backstroke swimmers